The 1920 Belmont Stakes was the 52nd running of the Belmont Stakes. It was the 14th Belmont Stakes held at Belmont Park in Elmont, New York and was held on June 12, 1920. With a field of only two horses, heavily favored Man o' War won the 1 –mile race (11 f; 2.2 km) by 20 lengths over Donnacona.

Man o' War's time of 2:14.2 set a world record for 1 –mile.

Results

References

External links 
BelmontStakes.com

Belmont Stakes races
Belmont Stakes
Belmont Stakes
Belmont Stakes